Vensecar Internacional C.A. is a cargo airline based in Caracas, Venezuela. It operates scheduled services around Central America and the Caribbean on behalf of DHL Aviation.

History 
The airline was established in January 31, 1986. It is owned by Jose Henrique D'Apollo (51%) and DHL (49%).

Destinations 

Vensecar Internacional operates freight services to the following international scheduled destinations (as of May 2020):

Fleet

Current fleet 

As of January 2021, the Vensecar Internacional fleet consists the following aircraft:

Former fleet 
Vensecar Internacional previously owned the following aircraft:

1 Beechcraft 65
2 Boeing 727-100F
4 Boeing 727-200F
2 Boeing 737-400SF
2 Dassault Falcon 20
1 Learjet 24

See also 
List of airlines of Venezuela

References

External links 

Official website

Airlines of Venezuela
Airlines established in 1986
Cargo airlines
Venezuelan companies established in 1986